The Capilla de San Isidro, in Costilla County, Colorado, near Los Fuertes, was built around 1894.  It was listed on the National Register of Historic Places in 2013.

It is located at 21801 County Road K5, 0.3 miles east of its intersection with County Road 21.

References

External links

National Register of Historic Places in Costilla County, Colorado
Buildings and structures completed in 1894